The Anzin miners' strike, sometimes known as the great strike of the Anzin miners, was a long strike of the miners of the mining company of Anzin ("Compagnie des mines d'Anzin") in 1884 which resulted in the recognition of the unions' right to strike under the so-called Waldeck-Rousseau law of the same year. It brought together more than 10,000 strikers for 56 days and as covered by the press had a national impact. Émile Zola was inspired by it to write Germinal.

History 
The Restoration created an economic history favourable to the development of industries in the north, among other things through its protectionism. The Compagnie des mines d'Anzin grew into a large corporation, with influential political figures on its board of directors. In 1833, the miners of the company began a strike known as the "Riot of four cents", the demand being the cancellation of a wage cut of this amount decided on by the company. At the end of four days of strike and occupation of the siege, the mining company called in 3,000 soldiers. The miners returned to work without having obtained anything. The leaders were tried for conspiracy, and some were condemned to light sentences, but newspapers echoing the trial revealed the miners' conditions and the company finally gave in on the pay issue.

With the discovery of the continuation of the coal deposit in the Pas-de-Calais in 1841, the Compagnie des mines d'Anzin, which until then had been in a quasi-monopoly situation, was subjected to stronger competition, faced with more modern companies. Its employees were badly affected by the new constraints of profitability, and it experienced several strikes in the second half of the 19th century, which affected the city of Anzin where it remained the main employer, and where the settlements were occupied by troops several times.

References 

1884 in France
Labor disputes in France
Coal mining in Europe
1884 labor disputes and strikes
Miners' labor disputes